The Wales University Officers' Training Corps (Wales UOTC) is an Army Reserve unit that recruits university students in Wales including at Cardiff University, Aberystwyth University, and Swansea University.

History 

In 1900 University College, Wales in Aberystwyth raised a company, sanctioned by the War Office, which was known as E Company of the 5th Volunteer Battalion, South Wales Borderers.

In 1908, the University College, Wales contingent of the Officers' Training Corps was formally raised in response to the recommendations of the committee formed by Lord Haldane.

In 1910, the University College of North Wales contingent followed and, in 1913, the University College of South Wales and Monmouthshire contingent was also raised.

The UOTCs of Aberystwyth and Bangor supplied officers to the British Army during the Second World War, but after the war recruitment fell and the UOTCs were suspended in October 1952 and March 1948 respectively.

Meanwhile, the University College of South Wales and Monmouthshire OTC had also supplied officers to the British Army during the Second World War but subsequently developed to become "Cardiff UOTC" and, in October 1990, it became "Wales UOTC". Wales UOTC is based at Maindy Barracks in Cardiff.

Universities 
Affiliated universities include: Bangor, Aberystwyth, Swansea, Cardiff, Cardiff Metropolitan, University of South Wales, University of Wales Trinity St David and The Royal Welsh College of Music & Drama.

References

Bibliography 

Military of Wales
Officers' Training Corps